Jerry Wilkinson (born February 27, 1956) is a former American football defensive end. He played for the Los Angeles Rams in 1979 and for the Cleveland Browns and San Francisco 49ers in 1980.

References

1956 births
Living people
American football defensive ends
Oregon State Beavers football players
Los Angeles Rams players
Cleveland Browns players
San Francisco 49ers players